Izgrev  may refer to:
 Izgrev, Sofia - one of the 24 districts in Sofia Municipality in the Sofia City Province, Bulgaria
 One of eight villages in Bulgaria:
 Izgrev, Blagoevgrad Province - in the Blagoevgrad municipality of the Blagoevgrad Province
 Izgrev, Burgas Province - in the Tsarevo municipality of the Burgas Province
 Izgrev, Pleven Province - in the Levski municipality of the Pleven Province
 Izgrev, Sliven Province - in the Sliven municipality of the Sliven Province
 Izgrev, Smolyan Province - in the Nedelino municipality of the Smolyan Province
 Izgrev, Shumen Province - in the Venets municipality of the Shumen Province
 Izgrev, Varna Province - in the Suvorovo municipality of the Varna Province
 Izgrev, Yambol Province - in the Elhovo municipality of the Yambol Province